University of Rovira i Virgili (URV) is located in the Catalan cities of Tarragona and Reus, Spain. Its name is in honour of Antoni Rovira i Virgili.

The University of Rovira I Virgili (URV) is a nationally and internationally recognized teaching and research institution with centers in Tarragona, Reus, Vila-Seca, Tortosa, and El Vendrell. In 2018 and 2019 it was ranked the 78th World's Best Young University with less than 50 years (Times Higher Education World University Rankings). In 2020 it was ranked within the top 200 world's universities by the Times Higher Education 2020 ranking, which recognizes universities for their socials and economic impact based on 17 United Nations Sustainable Development Goals. At Spanish level, in 2017  URV was ranked the 4th in publication production by faculty number, and the 7th with Highly Cited Papers by faculty number. In 2014 URV obtained the HR Excellence in Research award by the EC, renewed in 2017. URV offers doctoral studies distributed in 24 programs and annually welcomes 11400 undergraduate, 1300 master and 1200 PhD students.

History

University education in the Tarragona area goes back to the 16th century, when Cardinal Gaspar Cervantes de Gaeta founded a university to teach Grammar, the Arts, and Theology. This Universitas Tarraconensis was practically wiped out by the reprisals of Philip V after the War of Succession.
University education did not return to the Tarragona area until the second half of the 20th century, when three different paths converged to form the Universitat Rovira i Virgili: The Universitat Laboral (Technical College), created by the Ministry of Employment in 1956, started to teach technical courses for the first time in 1961–62 with specialties in mechanical, electrical and chemical engineering. It depended on the Terrassa School of Engineering. Later, in 1972, the title of "Engineer" was changed to "Technical Engineer", and the Universitat Laboral ceased to depend on Terrassa and dropped its mechanical and engineering courses.

In 1973, the Universitat Laboral, now known as the University School of Industrial Engineering became part of the Universitat Politècnica de Catalunya. In 1971, the Universitat de Barcelona set up local branches of the faculties of Philosophy and Letters, and Sciences in the city of Tarragona. From the very beginning, the aim was for these new courses to achieve the highest possible university recognition. As early as 1972, a request was made to convert these branches into a university college so that they could provide complete first-cycle courses. In 1977, medical courses began in Reus, and in 1983 the Spanish Parliament established the Faculty of Philosophy and Arts and the Faculty of Chemistry in Tarragona. It must be noted the collaboration of Artur Juncosa Carbonell.

In 1991, the Catalan Parliament created the Universitat Rovira I Virgili from the university centers already existing in Reus and Tarragona and which depended on the Universitat de Barcelona. The 16th-century Tarragona University was thus recovered. Since then, the university has gradually increased the number of courses on offer by creating such new campuses as Sescelades and Catalunya in Tarragona, and Bellissens in Reus.

Teaching

The Universitat Rovira I Virgili consists of 12 faculties and schools in which 1,500 lecturers and researchers provide degrees to over 11,000 undergraduates and 1,500 master's-degree and doctoral students, who attend courses in all knowledge areas: the sciences, health sciences, social and legal sciences, engineering and architecture, arts and humanities, all adapted to the European Higher Education Area.

Campuses, faculties and schools

The Universitat Rovira i Virgili has 6 campuses that house 7 faculties, 3 technical schools and 2 university schools, and also the headquarters of Baix Penedès:
Campus Catalunya: Tarragona city centre 
Faculty of Arts
Faculty of Law
Faculty of Nursing
Campus Sescelades: north of Tarragona city 
Faculty of Education Sciences and Psychology
Faculty of Chemistry
Faculty of Oenology
School of Engineering (ETSE)
School of Chemical Engineering (ETSEQ)
Campus Vapor Nou: Reus city centre 
Faculty of Medicine and Health Sciences
Campus Bellissens: east of Reus 
Faculty of Business and Economics
School of Architecture (ETSA)
Campus Vila-seca: Vila-seca 
Faculty of Tourism and Geography
Campus Terres de l'Ebre: Tortosa 
Undergraduate courses are provided in Nursing, Business Management and Administration, Infant Education and Primary Education.
Headquarters of Baix Penedès
Undergraduate courses are provided in Nursing and Infant Education.

Affiliated centres

Centre of Aviation Studies (CESDA) - Reus

Research

The leading research areas are archaeology, chemistry, tourism, oenology, energy, the environment, nutrition and health, the economy, law and education.

Technology and innovation centres

CITEE – Technological Innovation Centre in Electrical Engineering

The Centre for Technological Innovation in Electronic Engineering (CITEE) of the Universitat Rovira i Virgili is a member of CIDEM's IT network of Technological Innovation Centres. It was created in 1999 and its objective is to promote research, development, technology transfer, innovation and lifelong learning in companies and technology centres.

The CITEE works in the general thematic area of the information technologies and, more specifically, in electronic technologies and instrumentation, control and automation, communications, robotics, industrial computing and electrical engineering.

The CITEE's activity has its origins in the R&D and technology transfer carried out by the Department of Electronic, Electric and Automatic Engineering since it was founded in 1993.

The centre is located in the School of Engineering on the Campus Sescelades in Tarragona.

ATIC – Advanced Technology Innovation Centre
ATIC works on patents and transfer projects in the fields of biotechnology, the environment, fluid mechanics and health in conjunction with the national and international manufacturing sector. It also provides consultancy and technical reports in its fields of expertise.

As far as the environment is concerned, the Centre focuses on environmental protection, wind engineering, green engineering and sustainable chemistry.

In the field of fluid technology, the areas studied are experimental and computational fluid mechanics, mass and heat transport, computational science and applied mathematics.

Work is carried out on biosensors, immunosensors, nanobiotechnology, biochips and multisensors, to mention just a few examples.

The Health Area is also certified by the ISO. Its main objective is to develop new knowledge on the confluence of bio-, micro- and nanotechnology in an attempt to develop diagnostic systems that are economic, non-invasive and intelligent, and which are potentially applicable to clinical, environmental and/or food analysis. Among the studies undertaken, of particular importance are the systems for detecting gluten in food and the detection of celiac disease.

AMIC – Environmental and Industrial Applications of Catalysis
AMIC is an innovation centre of the Cidem IT Network that works to offer key-in-hand solutions to environmental and industrial problems occurring in the manufacturing sectors. It specializes in heterogeneous catalysis and materials.

AMIC designs, synthesizes, characterizes and evaluates the performance, selectivity and life of catalysts. It also works on the synthesis of microporous and mesoporous materials such as zeolites, HMS, MCM, SBA, mesoporous cerium oxide, hydrotalcites, activated carbon, high surface area aluminium fluoride, different phases of aluminium oxide, and nanomaterials such as Ag, Au, Pt, Cu and Pd nanocubes and other morphologies.

TecaT – Innovation Centre in Catalyst Development for Sustainable Processes
The Innovation Centre in Catalyst Development for Sustainable Processes is the sixth URV innovation centre that belongs to the CIDEM IT Network (Catalan Government). The origins of the Centre lie in the research carried out by the group Organometallics and Homogeneous Catalysis (OMICH) of the URV's Department of Physical and Inorganic Chemistry. This group researches into catalysts and since the middle of the 1980s has mainly worked on homogeneous and enantioselective catalysis. It has always received public funding.

METEOR - Membrane Technology and Process Engineering

METEOR belongs to the TECNIO d’ACC1Ó network of the Catalan Government and is involved in the following activities:

- Research and development
in technology and microtechnology of membranes
in membrane process engineering
in polymer synthesis
- Technology transfer
in technology and microtechnology of membranes and polymers
in process engineering
- Courses
made to measure on technology and microtechnology of membranes and polymers
TecnATox - Centre for Environmental, Food and Toxicological Technology
The mission of TecnATox is to carry out research and development in the field of environmental protection in Europe and satisfy the needs of government and the manufacturing sectors through knowledge and technology transfer in order to improve health and the quality of life, and protect the environment. TecnATox is a research centre that specializes in the transfer of technology in the ambit of toxicology, environmental health and food. It is a member of Xarxa TECNIO d'ACC1Ó (Network of support to technological innovation).

The centre is located at the Faculty of Medicine and Health Sciences, in Reus, the School of Chemical Engineering and the Faculty of Education Sciences and Psychology of the Universitat Rovira i Virgili, both in Tarragona.

The Toxicology and Environmental Health Laboratory (LTSM) was founded in 1985 and, at present, is staffed by highly qualified research and technical personnel with considerable experience in the study, development and industrial implementation of all the services. In 2008, the LTSM was converted into the Centre for Environmental, Food and Toxicological Technology (TecnATox). The Centre officially became a member of the Xarxa IT (Network for Technological Innovation), which gives support to technological innovation. This network now goes under the name of TECNIO.

TecnATox was one of the first research groups in Catalonia, Spain and Europe to evaluate the risks to human health of exposure to environmental chemical agents. The centre is divided into four areas of expertise:
Environmental health and risk assessment
Food toxicology
Evaluative toxicology
Taylor-made courses

And it takes an interest in the following sectors:
Chemicals
Plastics
Waste
Pharmacy and cosmetics
Detergents
Cements
Electricity and electronics
Water
Energy
Automotion
Food
Health

The Universitat Rovira i Virgili and TecnATox have the following objectives:
To carry out research and development in the field of environmental protection in Europe.
To satisfy the needs of the government and the manufacturing sectors.
To transfer knowledge and technology in order to improve health and quality of life, and protect the environment.
CTNS – Technology Centre for Nutrition and Health
The Technology Centre for Nutrition and Health gives food companies support and assistance in the field of nutrition and health.

The centre has the institutional support of ACC1Ó (Agency for the Innovation and Internationalization of Catalan Enterprise), the Universitat Rovira I Virgili and the Reus Town Council, as well as 14 representative companies from the sector. It is also a member of the following knowledge, research, transfer and innovation networks: The European NutriGenomics Organisation (NuGO), the Catalan Association of Technology (ACTec), the National Network of Biostatistics (Biostatnet), the Network of Scientific Culture Units (UCC - FECYT) and the Innovative Business Association for Nutrition and Health (AINS).

CTQC – Chemistry Technology Centre of Catalonia
The Chemistry Technology Centre of Catalonia (CTQC) is a non-profit making private foundation that was created in 2008 with the purpose of providing services, carrying out RDI projects, and creating, adapting and transferring innovative technologies.

Among the centre's priorities are research into new materials, water technology and the application of European environmental directives to the chemical industry.

The centre is a member of the Catalan Government's ACC1Ó Network of Technology Centres, and the Southern Catalonia Campus of International Excellence (CEICS).

Research centres

CRAMC – Research Centre for Behavioural Assessment
CRAMC is a URV research centre made up of researchers from the Department of Psychology. It specializes in generating and/or applying instruments for assessing and measuring behaviour.
In its session of 22 December 2005, the URV's Governing Council approved the creation of the centre in response to the quality of the research being undertaken.

EMAS - Research Center on Engineering of Materials and Micro/NanoSystems
The Research Center in Engineering of Materials and Micro/NanoSystems, EMaS, belongs to the University of Rovira i Virgili. Its research work focuses on the field of the science and engineering of new materials and their nanostructuration, and on their application to the design and development of micro and nanosystems.
 
The EMaS Research Center has more than 80 researchers in such fields as physics, chemistry, chemical engineering, optics, photonics, electronic engineering, and environmental engineering.

CEDAT - Tarragona Centre for Environmental Law Studies
The Alcalde Pere Lloret Centre for Environmental Law Studies in Tarragona (CEDAT) was founded in 2007 and is a project that involves Tarragona City Council, EMATSA (Tarragona Water Board), EMT (the Tarragona Municipal Transport Company) and the Universitat Rovira i Virgili. It arose out of a long history of cooperation on issues of environmental law between the Tarragona City Council and the Faculty of Law and the Department of Public Law of the Universitat Rovira i Virgili, and it represents the institutionalization of this cooperation.

The Centre bears the name of Alcalde Pere Lloret, a famous jurist and mayor of Tarragona, in recognition of his defence of democratic principles and human values in the governance of the city of Tarragona.

CREIP - Research Centre on Industrial Economics and Public Economics 
The Research Centre on Industrial Economics and Public Economics (CREIP) is organized around two topics of economic analysis: industrial organization and public economics. The former studies the interaction between the productive agents in markets, with particular emphasis on the economic implications of the decisions taken in the public sector.

C3 - Centre for Climate Change
The Universitat Rovira i Virgili's Centre for Climate Change (C3), located on the Terres de l’Ebre Campus, is continuing the research and teaching tradition of the  Research Group in Climate Change of the Predepartmental Unit of Geography.

Among its areas of activity are research, teaching, scientific consultancy, knowledge transfer and the communication of these activities.

C3 undertakes research projects and discloses its results in publications and at scientific congresses, symposia and seminars. It helps to organize and teach master's degree and doctoral programmes, and other specialist and training courses for professionals. It carries out scientific and technical projects, and channels the transfer of results to individuals and public and private institutions within the framework of the legislation in force. It also organizes scientific outreach events and provides scientific and technological services.

University institutes
Institute of Education Sciences of the Universitat Rovira i Virgili (ICE)
The Institute of Education Sciences (ICE) is a university institute that provides such services as teacher training, educational innovation and technical consultancy at a variety of educational levels.

Catalan Institute of Classical Archaeology (ICAC)
The Catalan Institute of Classical Archaeology is a public research centre created in the year 2000 by the Catalan Government and the Universitat Rovira i Virgili, with the participation of the Inter-university Council of Catalonia. It aims to carry out research, teach advanced courses and provide information about classical civilization and culture. It is housed in a building belonging to the Universitat Rovira i Virgili and the Tarragona City Council.

As well as organizing various lines of research in classical archaeology, the institute also provides a master's degree in classical archaeology in conjunction with the Universitat Rovira I Virgili and the Universitat Autònoma de Barcelona.

Institute of Chemical Research of Catalonia (ICIQ)
Catalan Institute of Human Palaeoecology and Social Evolution (IPHES)
The Catalan Institute of Human Palaeoecology and Social Evolution is a transdisciplinary, advanced research institute that was founded in 2006. Its objectives are to carry out scientific research programmes in the earth and life sciences, promote their socialization and use the results in prospective social research of an evolutionary nature.

On the basis of the institute's research, third-cycle courses are taught at the Universitat Rovira i Virgili.

Pere Virgili Institute for Health Research (IISPV)
The Pere Virgili Institute for Health Research (IISPV) promotes, conducts, manages and communicates health and biomedical research, and research training. To achieve this last objective, IISPV organizes a programme in research training and it has entered into collaboration agreements with health institutions and the Universitat Rovira i Virgili to share initiatives and resources.

The institute conducts various lines of research. One of them is nutrition and health, a field in which it has leading groups in both hospitals and the university. There is a project underway to link the research and business activity that is taking place within the Tecnoparc, in Reus, to which the IISPV will contribute all of its human and technical potential.

Catalonia Institute for Energy Research (IREC)
The URV is a member of the IREC board, the aim of which is to contribute to the sustainable development of society and increase the competitiveness of companies through innovation and the development of new technological products. It is also involved in medium- and long-term research, and scientific development and technological knowledge in the field of energy.

The main goals of IREC, then, are to
-	promote and carry out research into energy to obtain results of high scientific and technological value in the medium and long term;
-	drive the development of the research lines in energy technology approved by the Institute and adapt them to the demands of the sector;
-	provide engineering services with high added value to companies in the energy sector;
-	act as a strategic consultant for the government on energy issues;
-	construct a collaboration network with the major national and international energy technology and research centres;
-	provide companies and entrepreneurs with the technological innovations resulting from the institute's research;
-	take part in the specialized training of Catalan university students; and
-	make the institute's laboratories and equipment available to university departments.

The technological and research areas of IREC are lighting, thermal energy and building, bioenergy and biofuels, offshore wind energy, power electronics and electrical networks, and advanced materials for energy.

University hospitals
Sant Joan University Hospital - Reus
Pere Mata Psychiatric University Hospital - Reus
Joan XXIII University Hospital - Tarragona

The Sant Joan University Hospital first started operating in the city of Tarragona in October 1967. At present it has 399 beds and 36 services.

URV Foundation

The URV Foundation is the institution created by the Universitat Rovira i Virgili to promote the relation between the university and society.

Since it was founded in 1999, the URV Foundation has provided a structure for about one hundred research groups and it has provided more than 14,000 students with courses taught by more than 3,000 academics and professionals.

Rankings
World University Rankings, Times Higher 2017 - 401-500th
QS rankings 2017 - 401-500th.

See also
 Joan Lluís Vives Institute 
 List of early modern universities in Europe

References

External links 
 Official site

Tarragona
University of Rovira i Virgili
Educational institutions established in 1991
1991 establishments in Spain
Universities and colleges in Spain